Bolaji Odojukan (born 22 April 1994), better known by his stage name BOJ is an English-Nigerian singer, songwriter and record producer. He is one-third of the musical group DRB LasGidi with TeeZee and Fresh L, and is known as a pioneer of alté.

Early life
Bolaji Odojukan was born in London, England and was raised in both the UK and Nigeria. He studied Business Management and Audio Engineering in university. After graduating, he moved back to Lagos in 2015. Bolaji parents was responsible for his music education, while growing up they played Lauryn Hill, Lagbaja, and Wyclef records in the house. In year 9 (JSS 3), Bolaji began making music while still schooling at Malvern College, in Malvern, Worcestershire, England.

Career
Boj joined the group DRB LasGidi in 2007 with his school friends Teezee and Fresh L. On 21 February 2014, Boj released his first solo mixtape titled #BOTM, including the single "Bolaji On The Microphone", abbreviated as "BOTM". On December 14, 2014, the single won the Best Alternative Song, at ninth edition of The Headie Awards. The deluxe was later released on 13 April 2016. On 13 July 2016, he signed a recording contract with HF Music, and released his first debut album Magic, on October 13, 2017. He released two collaborative extended play's titled Make E No Cause Fight in 2018, with Ajebutter22 and Make E No Cause Fight 2 in 2019 with Ajebutter22 & Falz.

On October 14, 2018, BOJ was part of the "Smooth Taste, That's Why" campaign that launched on thirteen billboards around Lagos and Abuja, by Jameson Irish Whiskey. In 2019, he signed a publishing and distribution deal with MOVES Recordings, with the release of "Your Love (Mogbe)", with Afro Nation, featuring Tiwa Savage. On 18 September 2020, Boj released the single "Abracadabra" featuring Davido and Mr Eazi. On 7 July 2021, he released the single "Money & Laughter" featuring Nigerian singer Zamir and Ghanaian singer Amaarae. On 23 July 2021, he appeared on Dave's album We're All Alone in This Together on the song "Lazarus". On December 10, 2021, MOVES Recordings featured "Your Love (Mogbe)", and "Abracadabra", in its double compilation album, 5 Years of Culture: Afrobeats, and 5 Years of Culture: Rap & Drill.

On 22 April 2022, Boj released his album Gbagada Express including guest appearances from Davido, Mr Eazi, Wizkid, Fireboy DML, Buju, Enny, Tiwa Savage, Darkovibes, Kofi Jamar, Joey B, Amaarae, Obongjayar, Moliy, Mellissa, Teezee, Zamir, Fresh L, Victony, and Afro Nation.

Artistry
Boj credits artists such as Wyclef Jean, Lauryn Hill, Bob Marley, Fela Kuti, Lagbaja, and Sean Paul as his musical influences. Boj is widely recognized as one of the pioneers of the fusion genre Alté, which incorporates musical influences from afrobeats, dancehall, reggae, hip hop, and alternative R&B. The term was first coined by Boj on his 2014 song "Paper", and was later used to describe left-field styles of music. Boj said in an interview that the term alté means "freedom to express yourself without boundaries, without the constraints of the mainstream in whatever sector, whether that's fashion, whether that's music, whether that's photography, whatever it is man."

Discography

Studio albums

Extended plays

Mixtapes

Tours

Supporting
Chapter One Tour (with Falana) (2019)

Concerts
One Mic Naija (2015)
Gidi Culture Festival (2017)
Porkoyum Food Fest (2018)
Jameson Connect Independence Day (2018)
ART X Lagos (2018)
Tiger's “Uncage Party” (2019)
Afro Nation (2021)

Co-headlining
COPA Lagos  (with Seyi Shay, Naeto C, and Falz)  (2016)
Nativeland  (with Skepta, J Hus, Burna Boy)  (2016)
Our Homecoming  (with Black Sherif, Fireboy DML, and BNXN)  (2022)
Afro Nation (with Machel Montano, Olamide, Wande Coal, Chronixx, Kizz Daniel, Naira Marley, Tory Lanez, Maitre Gims, and Teni)  (2020)

Supporting
Our Homecoming  (with Nonso Amadi)  (2015)
Gidi Culture Festival  (with Ycee)  (2016)
OLIC2  (with Olamide)  (2016)
rare Live concert (with Odunsi (The Engine)) (2018)
The Redtv Rave (with Burna Boy, Jidenna and Olamide) (2019)

References 

Living people
1994 births
21st-century Nigerian male singers
Nigerian male rappers
Rappers from Lagos
Nigerian hip hop singers
Nigerian male musicians
Nigerian alté singers